Ercan may refer to:

Given name
Ercan Akbay (born 1959), writer, painter and musician
Ercan Aktuna (1940–2013), Turkish football player
Ercan Durmaz (born 1965), Turkish-German actor
Ercan Muslu (born 1988), Turkish long-distance runner
Ercan Özçelik (born 1967), actor and a German citizen
Ercan Şahin (born 1971), musician, songwriter, composer, Bağlama player
Ercan Süleymany (born 1981), Albanian footballer
Ercan Yazgan (1946–2018), Turkish comedian

Surname
Abdullah Ercan (born 1971), Turkish football player
Aytaç Ercan (born 1976), Turkish Paralympian wheelchair basketballer
Mine Ercan (born 1987), Turkish women's wheelchair basketball player
Şeyma Ercan (born 1994), Turkish female volleyball player

Other uses
Ercan International Airport, principal airport of entry into the de facto non recognised Turkish Republic of Northern Cyprus

See also
Erkan

Turkish-language surnames
Turkish masculine given names